The Rose River, a perennial river of the North-East Murray catchment of the Murray-Darling basin, is located in the Alpine region of Victoria, Australia. It flows from the northern slopes of the Mount Buffalo National Park in the Australian Alps, joining with the Dandongadale River in remote national park territory.

Location and features
The river flows generally north by east, most of its course through the remote national park before reaching its confluence with the Dandongadale River within the Mount Buffalo National Park. The river descends  over its  course.

See also

References

North-East catchment
Rivers of Hume (region)
Victorian Alps